Gary Antonio Russell (born 19 January 1993) is an American professional boxer.

Professional boxing career
Russel twice reached the finals of Golden Gloves as an amateur, winning the gold medal in 2013 and finishing as a runner-up in 2014.

Russel made his professional debut against Harold Reyes on 31 January 2015. He won the fight by a second-round knockout. He amassed a 15–0 record during the next five years, winning twelve of those fights by way of stoppage. Russel had his first step-up in competition against Jesus Martinez on 8 February 2020, on the undercard of the WBC featherweight championship bout between Gary Russell Jr. and Tugstsogt Nyambayar. Gonzalez was disqualified in the sixth round for repeatedly hitting Russell low and holding in the fifth and sixth rounds. Russel was leading 50–45 on all three of the judges scorecards at the time of the stoppage.

Russel faced Juan Carlos Payano on 19 December 2020, on the undercard of the WBC interim featherweight title bout between Reymart Gaballo and his future opponent Emmanuel Rodríguez. He won the fight by a seventh-round technical decision, with scores of 59–55, 59-55 and 58–56. The fight was stopped at the very beginning of the seventh round, due to a cut above Payano's left eye, which was caused by an accidental head clash in the fifth round.

Russel faced the former IBF bantamweight titleholder Emmanuel Rodríguez on 14 August 2021, in a WBA bantamweight title eliminator, at the Dignity Health Sports Park in Carson, California. The fight was ruled a no decision after just 16 seconds. Referee Sharon Sands ruled that Rodriguez was unable to continue, due to a cut on the bridge of his nose which came from an accidental clash of heads. Russel fought once more in 2021, against Alexandro Santiago on 27 November 2021. He won the fight by majority decision, with scores of 95-95, 96-94 and 96–94.

Russel faced Emmanuel Rodríguez on 15 October 2022, in a WBA and IBF bantamweight title eliminator.. The bout was a rematch of their 14 August 2021 fight, which ended in a no contest, due to a clash of heads. He lost the fight by a tenth-round technical decision, with scores of 100–90, 99–91 and 99–93.

Professional boxing record

References

Living people
1993 births
American male boxers
Boxers from Maryland
People from Prince George's County, Maryland
Bantamweight boxers
National Golden Gloves champions